Mahfoud Brahimi (born 24 February 1985) is a male Algerian middle-distance runner. He competed in the 800 metres event at the 2011 World Championships in Athletics in Seoul, Korea.

See also
 Algeria at the 2011 World Championships in Athletics

References

External links
 

1985 births
Living people
Place of birth missing (living people)
Algerian male middle-distance runners
World Athletics Championships athletes for Algeria
21st-century Algerian people
20th-century Algerian people